Permata Irama is the special compilation album by Malaysian pop singer-songwriter Dato' Siti Nurhaliza which was released on sometimes around the year, 2008 before the released of Lentera Timur.

History
Although we had never even heard about the news reporting that Siti will be releasing a compilation album on that year, Suria Records finally released the traditional compilation album which combined all the biggest ethnic hits songs by Siti such as "Balqis", "Cindai", "Hati Kama" her duet with the renowned singer Noraniza Idris and plus the rare song that usually included in any of Siti's traditional album, her duets with Tan Sri Dato SM Salim in "Pandang-Pandang, Jeling-Jeling" & "Bergending Dang Gong" where the later one composed by Pak Ngah and lyrics penned by Siso.

The most anticipated ethic compilation album spawned other haunting tunes such as "Badarsila", "Ya Maulai", "Nirmala" & "Lagu Rindu" the only song composed by Yassin himself. This album is a must have for all the lovers of Siti's creative ethnic albums as it had the collections of all Siti's greatest hits ethnic songs including the ones that rarely can be found on her other albums. Most of the songs are dominated by composers such as Pak Ngah, S.Atan & many others and many of the songs are recognised and winning many awards here and abroad.

Track listing

This album features 12 greatest traditional songs in Siti's credit and are arranged according to the popularity of these songs by fans.

References

2003 compilation albums
Siti Nurhaliza compilation albums
Malay-language compilation albums